Georges Ibrahim Abdallah (born 2 April 1951) is a Lebanese communist militant and the longest held prisoner in Europe. He is currently serving a life sentence for the murder of Charles R. Ray and Yacov Barismantov in Lannemezan jail in France.

Early life
Born in the town Al Qoubaiyat in northern Lebanon, he joined the Lebanese Armed Revolutionary Factions (LARF) when the group formed following the discontinuation of the PFLP-EO. Georges became leader of the organization, and conducted its operations from France, where he used the aliases of Salih al-Masri and Abdu-Qadir Saadi.

Arrest
In 1984, Abdallah was driving to Lyon from Switzerland to pick up a deposit for an apartment when he was pulled over by chance by French Police. He was found with a forged Algerian passport and subsequently arrested. Police found out his true identity during a police raid of his apartment where several guns were found. He was sentenced to life in prison in 1987 for the 1982 murder of Lieutenant Colonel Charles R. Ray, an assistant US military attaché and murder of Israeli diplomat Yaakov Bar-Simantov outside his home in Paris on 3 April 1982, as well as involvement in the attempted assassination of former American consul in Strasbourg Robert O. Homme, on 26 March 1984. The murders were for American and Israeli involvement in the 1982 Lebanon War as well as their occupation of Lebanon.

Abdallah is imprisoned in France and has released communiqués from prison in solidarity with prisoners from other Communist groups, such as Ahmad Saadat, Action Directe and GRAPO.

After his capture, he testified "I do what I do because of the injustice done to human rights where Palestine is concerned."

Appeals for release 
In 1999, Abdallah completed the minimum portion of his life sentence, but several requests for parole were denied. In 2003, the court granted him parole but the US Department of State objected to the court decision. Dominique Perben, the Minister of Justice at the time, made an appeal against the release.

Every two years Abdallah has the right to ask for a new release date, which has been refused more than five times. New laws were created (Loi Dati 2008) for the prevention of reoffending, which were applied retroactively on his case.

On 10 January 2013, Abdallah was granted parole on appeal by the Chamber of Sentences Application of Paris on the condition of an order of deportation from France. Abdallah's lawyer said that his client hopes to return to Lebanon and take up a teaching job. Victoria Nuland, spokeswoman of the US State Department, declared to the press the US government's objection to his release on 11 January 2013. The United States ambassador to France, Charles Rivkin stated "I am disappointed by the decision today.... Life imprisonment was the appropriate sentence for Mr Abdallah’s serious crimes, and there is legitimate concern that Mr. Abdallah would continue to represent a danger to the international community if he were allowed to go free."

14 January 2013 was the scheduled date for Abdallah to return to Lebanon after almost 30 years of imprisonment in France. However Manuel Valls, the Minister of the Interior, refused to sign an administrative paper for deporting Abdallah. As a result of Valls's refusal, court proceedings took place on 15 January 2013. The prosecutor, under the Minister of Justice's authority, made a second appeal against his release (the first appeal was on November 2012). 
A complaint was sent in June 2013 against France to the investigators of the Working Group on Arbitrary Detention. Another complaint was sent to the French Supreme Court against Minister Valls for not signing the administrative paper necessary for Abdallah's release.

As of 2020, Abdallah is still incarcerated in France. He has done multiple hunger strikes in solidarity with Palestinian protestors. 

Several organizations support Abdallah's release such as Human Rights League (France), French Jewish Union for Peace and Association France-Palestine Solidarité.

Personal life
He is the uncle of Chloé Delaume.

Honors 
In December 2013, the French city of Bagnolet (a suburb located east of Paris) voted to make Abdallah an "honorary resident." The city council's motion (which did not mention Abdallah's role in Ray's murder) described him as a “communist activist” and a “political prisoner” who “belongs to the resistance movement of Lebanon" and is a "determined defender of the Palestinian just cause."

References

External links
Liberate Georges Abdallah campaign

Lebanese people imprisoned abroad
1951 births
Living people
Lebanese left-wing activists
Lebanese communists
Lebanese Christians
People from Akkar Governorate
Lebanese people convicted of murder
People convicted of murder by France